Michaela Hermansson (born 9 February 1990) is a Swedish footballer midfielder who plays for Kvarnsvedens IK.

External links 
 

1990 births
Living people
Swedish women's footballers
Damallsvenskan players
Women's association football midfielders
Kvarnsvedens IK players
Elitettan players